Badal Roy (born Amarendra Roy Chowdhury; 16 October 1939 – 18 January 2022) was an Indian tabla player, percussionist, and recording artist known for his work in jazz, world music, and experimental music.

Biography
Roy was born Amarendra Roy Chowdhury on 16 October 1939, into a Hindu family in a predominantly Muslim eastern Bengal region in Comilla, British India (which later became East Pakistan, then Bangladesh). His mother, Sova Rani Roy Chowdhury, was a homemaker, while his father, Satyenda Nath Roy Chowdhury was a government official in Eastern Pakistan. The name Badal (meaning "rain," "cloud", or "thunder" in the Bengali language), was given to him by his grandfather after he began crying in the rain as a toddler. He spoke the Bengali, English, Hindi, and Urdu languages.

He was introduced to music, in particular the percussion instrument Tabla, by his uncle. An early inspiration for Roy was American popular music, and he particularly enjoyed the music of artists such as Elvis Presley, Pat Boone, and Nat King Cole. His first exposure to jazz came when he saw a concert by Duke Ellington in Karachi, West Pakistan in 1963.

Roy received a master's degree in statistics. He came to New York City in 1968 to work on a PhD with only eight dollars in his pocket, he began working as a busboy and waiter in various Indian restaurants in the New York area, including Pak Indian Curry House, Taste of India and Raga. He later settled in East Brunswick Township, New Jersey. He later received lessons from Alla Rakha, a tabla player who performed with the sitar player Ravi Shankar and was Zakir Hussain's father.

Roy married Geeta Vashi in 1974. The couple had a son and lived in Wilmington, Delaware. Roy died from COVID-19 in Wilmington on 18 January 2022, at the age of 82.

Career
When Roy moved to New York, he worked as a waiter in Indian restaurants in the region. In the weekends, he performed as a tabla artist accompanying a sitar player at A Taste of India, an Indian restaurant in Greenwich Village in New York. Here, he was spotted by John McLaughlin and was asked for accompanying him in jamming sessions and later partnered to record an album My Goal's Beyond (1971). The album was considered a landmark one in Indian-themed jazz.

Steve Gorn spotted him in a Manhattan restaurant called Raga, eventually attracting the attention of Miles Davis. Davis invited Roy to join his group, and he recorded on Davis's albums On the Corner (1972), Big Fun (1969–72; released 1974), and Get Up with It (1970–74). Roy subsequently performed and recorded with many leading jazz musicians, including Davis, Dave Liebman, Pharoah Sanders, John McLaughlin, Herbie Hancock, Herbie Mann, Pat Metheny, Lester Bowie, Airto Moreira, Charlie Haden, Purna Das Baul, and Ornette Coleman (playing in Coleman's electric band Prime Time). In the 1990s Roy began performing with the Brazilian guitar duo Duofel. He has also collaborated with Ken Wessel and Stomu Takeishi in a fusion trio named Alankar. They currently have one album entitled Daybreak.

Roy has appeared and offered workshops at RhythmFest, the Starwood Festival, and at the SpiritDrum Festival, a special tribute to the late Babatunde Olatunji (co-sponsored by ACE and Musart) with Muruga Booker, Jim Donovan of Rusted Root, Halim El-Dabh, Richie "Shakin'" Nagan, Jeff Rosenbaum and Sikiru Adepoju, among others. He often played with Muruga Booker in the Global Village Ceremonial Band, and with Michael Wolff & Impure Thoughts. In 2004, Roy worked with Richie Havens on the album The Grace of the Sun. In the first half of 2006, Roy travelled to Japan to appear in a tribute for David Baker, his recently deceased recording engineer and friend.

In addition to tabla, Roy also played a variety of percussion instruments including shakers, bells, rain stick, and flexatone. His notable students include Geoffrey Gordon.

In 2008, the album Miles From India, a tribute to Miles Davis on which Roy appeared, received a Grammy nomination.

Helix, his final recording as a member of Michael Moss's Accidental Orchestra, was in 2016.

Musical style 
Unlike many tabla players, Roy does not come from a family of professional musicians and is essentially self-taught, although he studied with his late maternal uncle Dwijendra Chandra Chakraborty as a child, and also studied briefly with Alla Rakha. Consequently, his playing is freer than that of many other tabla players, who adhere more strictly to the tala system of Indian rhythm. He often played a set of up to eight tabla (tuned to different pitches) and two baya at a time, which he played melodically as well as rhythmically.

Discography
Source(s):

As leader
 1975 – Ashirbad (Trio Records)
 1976 – Passing Dreams (Adamo Records and Tapes)
 1997 – One in the Pocket (Nomad Records)
 1998 – Daybreak – Alankar
 2002 – Kolkata Rose (with Geoff Warren)
 2002 – Raga Roni  (with Perry Robinson & Ed Schuller) Geeta

With Amit Chatterjee
 1997 – Endless Radiance (Art of the Duo) (Tutu)

With Ornette Coleman
 1995 – Tone Dialing (Harmelodic/Verve)

With Miles Davis
 1974 – Big Fun (2xLP) Columbia Records, 2xCD Columbia (reissued 2000)
 1974 – Get Up With It (2xLP) Columbia Records 1974 (2xCD Coline 1991, 2000)
 1988 – Miles Davis: The Columbia Years 1955–1985 (Box set, also 4xCD) Columbia
 1993 – On The Corner (CD, Album)   Columbia Records, (Legacy reissued 2000)
 1997 – Miles Davis In Concert: Live At Philharmonic Hall, Legacy
 1998 – Panthalassa: The Music of Miles Davis 1969–1974

With Steve Gorn
 1983 – Yantra: Flute and Tabla (reissued 1994) (Music of the World)
 1982 – Asian Journal (with Nana Vasconcelos & Steve Gorn) (Nomad Records)

With Richie Havens
 2004 – Grace of the Sun

With Bill Laswell
 1998 – Sacred System: Nagual Site (CD)   BMG
 2000 – Lo. Def Pressure (LP & CD) Sub Rosa

With David Liebman
 1974 – Lookout Farm (LP) ECM Records
 1975 – Passing Dreams (reissued 1998, 2002)
 1975 – Drum Ode (LP) ECM Records
 1975 – Sweet Hands Horizon Records
 1975 – Ashirbad (reissued 2002)
 1976 – Father Time

With Herbie Mann
 Sun Belt (Atlantic)

With John McLaughlin
 1970 – My Goals Beyond Knit Classics (Ryko)

With Yoko Ono
 1982 – It's Alright (I See Rainbows)
 1992 – Onobox
 1992 – Walking on Thin Ice

With Mike Richmond
 1988 – Basic Tendencies (with Glen Velez) (Nomad Records)
 1982 – Asian Journal (with Nana Vasconcelos & Steve Gorn) (Nomad Records)

With Perry Robinson
 1978 – Kundalini

With Pharoah Sanders
 1972 – Wisdom Through Music (Impulse! Records)
 1974 – Love in Us All (CD) Universal Music (Japan)

With Lonnie Liston Smith
 1973 – Astral Traveling (Flying Dutchman)

With Leni Stern
 1991 – Ten Songs
 1998 – Recollection

With Steve Turre
 1992 – Sanctified Shells
 2000 – In the Valley of Sacred Sound – Harold E. Smith

With Barney McAll & Rufus Cappadocia
 2003 – Vivid  Jazzhead

With Michael Wolff & Impure Thoughts
 2000 – Impure Thoughts  Indianola Music
 2001 – Intoxicate  Indianola Music
 2004 – Dangerous Vision  Artemis Records
 2006 – Love & Destruction  Rong Records

With other artists
 1967 – Virgo Vibes – Roy Ayers Atlantic (reissued 2002)
 1979 – Earthquake Island – Jon Hassell (Tomato Music)
 1984 – Mood Swing – The Nails (LP) RCA
 1989 – Dancing with the Lion – Andreas Vollenweider (CD) CBS (reissued with bonus tracks 2005)
 1993 – Angel Rodeo – Lisa Sokolov Laughing Horse Records
 1993 – Prophecy: The Whale & the Elephant Trade Notes on the State of the World – Zusaan  (Flying Note)
 1994 – Espelho das Águas – Duofel (CD)(Velas)
 1997 – Rising Sun – D. K. Dyson (Ocean Records)
 1998 – Wake Up And Dream – Ekstasis (CD) CyberOctave
 2000 – Musica (with Luiz Bueno) MCD World Music
 2001 - Little Torch - Album: Rocket House - Chris Whitley
 2001 – Export Quality – Dum Dum Project (2xLP) X-Squared Records
 2001 – Daughters of the Sun – Nana Simopoulos (Na. Records)
 2001 – Branching Out – William Cepeda (Blue Jackel)
 2001 – The Sea to the North – Garth Hudson Woodstock Records
 2002 – Of Unicorns and Jasmine ...A Lover's Tale – Simirillion (with Cecil Wilson) Canned Air Records
 2002 – Sacred Spaces – Lee Boice
 2003 – Rebirth – Children on the Corner (Sonance Records)
 2003 – Heavy Skies – Roman Kunsman (Downtown Jazz)
 2005 – Free Funk (with Muruga Booker & members of the Global Village Ceremonial Band, Perry Robinson & Belita Woods) Qbico 2005
 2006 – Vivid (with Barney Mcall & Rufus Cappadocia) Jazzhead Oz
 Songs For Sitar and Tabla (with Arooj Lazewai) Cassette (Music of the World)
 2007 – Bonfire Dreams – Various Artists, ACE
 2008 – OrthoFunkOlogy – Free Funk (with Muruga Booker & Perry Robinson) Musart
 2008 – An die Musik – Nobu Stowe & Alan Munshower with Badal Roy (Soul Note)
 2008 – Miles From India – Various Artists (4Q/Times Square Records)

Notes

References

External links
 
 

1939 births
2022 deaths
American people of Pakistani descent
Tabla players
Bengali musicians
Bengali singers
People from East Brunswick, New Jersey
People from Comilla District
Miles Davis
Deaths from the COVID-19 pandemic in Delaware